Polonombauk (Meris, Miris, Ati) is a language of the interior of the southeast of Santo Island in Vanuatu.

François (2015:18-21) also lists Narmoris under the ISO 639-3 code [plb].

References

Sources
 .

Languages of Vanuatu
Espiritu Santo languages
Definitely endangered languages